Siegfried Kramarsky (April 14, 1893 – December 25, 1961) was a German American banker, philanthropist, and art collector of Jewish descent.

Life 
He was the director of the Amsterdam branch of the banking firm Lisser & Rosenkranz, headquartered in Hamburg, from 1923 until 1938. In light of the rise of Nazism in neighboring Germany, Kramarsky emigrated to Canada, and later New York City.

While in Amsterdam, Kramarsky compiled a large art collection that included several paintings of Vincent van Gogh. Shortly before the German invasion of the Netherlands, he bought Daubigny's Garden and the Portrait of Dr. Gachet from Franz Koenigs. In 1990, the latter was sold by Kramarsky's heirs to Ryoei Saito for $82.5 million, making it one of the most expensive paintings in the world.

Art collections from Kramarsky

References 

1893 births
1961 deaths
Businesspeople from Lübeck
German art collectors
20th-century art collectors
German bankers
Jewish emigrants from Nazi Germany to the United States
Jewish art collectors